As Long as We Both Shall Live: Two Novels is a young adult book by Lurlene McDaniel, published in October 2003. It consists of two previously published novels, Till Death Do Us Part and For Better, For Worse, Forever.

Characters
 April Lancaster is an 18-year-old whose life has changed drastically due to her ill health.
 Mark Gianni is a 22-year-old who never lets anything get in the way of his goal to become a race car driver, despite having lived with cystic fibrosis his whole life.
 Brandon Benedict is a bitter, eccentric graduate student.

See also

Till Death Do Us Part
For Better, For Worse, Forever

References

2003 American novels
American romance novels
American young adult novels
Novels about cystic fibrosis